Billy Talent III is the third studio album by Canadian rock band Billy Talent. It was released on July 10, 2009, in Europe, July 13 in the United Kingdom, July 14 in Canada, and September 22 in the US. The album debuted at No. 1 on the Canadian Albums Chart, selling over 40,000 copies in its first week. It also peaked at No. 107 on the Billboard 200, making it Billy Talent's highest-charting album to date. A demo version of one of the album's songs, "Turn Your Back", was released as a single in September 2008 and featured the band members of Anti-Flag, with the first legitimate single spawned by Billy Talent III is "Rusted from the Rain", which premiered May 17, 2009, on Triple J. The album version of "Turn Your Back" does not include Anti-Flag's vocals, as the single version does.

The second single from the album, "Devil on My Shoulder" was released on August 26, 2009.

A promotional website located at billytalent3.com was launched to showcase the making of the album. Part of the promotion also included the Billy Talent Widget which allowed listeners to become the "Ultimate Billy Talent Fan". The widget rewarded users with rare tracks, videos, pictures and interviews as fans "level up" their widgets.

On June 8, 2009, the band announced on their website, the release of a special deluxe edition of the album, entitled Billy Talent III: Guitar Villain Edition. The special edition includes a second disc of the album, with the guitar tracks removed so fans can play along. This edition includes also 4 additional demo songs, as well as guitar tabs for the whole album transcribed on 2 full size posters.

The band embarked on a supporting tour on February 21, 2009, starting with an Australian first leg.

In April 2010, the album won a Juno Award for best rock album of the year. Despite the commercial success, Billy Talent III received mixed to negative reviews. On Metacritic, the album earned a score of 45/100, which means "Mixed or average reviews" based on 7 critics; one review being negative and the other six being mixed.

Track listing

Special Guitar Villain edition second CD 
In addition to having the entire album featured without guitars (referred to as "Guitar Villain Demos") plus a Guitar Tab of the whole album, the Guitar Villain second disc also features four demo tracks:

Personnel 
 Benjamin Kowalewicz – lead vocals
 Ian D'Sa – lead guitar, backing vocals
 Jonathan Gallant – bass, backing vocals
 Aaron Solowoniuk – drums
 Brendan O'Brien – producer, additional percussion, tambourine, hammerchord, piano, mellotron

Charts and certifications

Weekly charts

Year-end charts

Certifications

Release history

References 

2009 albums
Albums produced by Brendan O'Brien (record producer)
Albums recorded at Henson Recording Studios
Atlantic Records albums
Billy Talent albums
Juno Award for Rock Album of the Year albums
Roadrunner Records albums